Lalit Mohan Shyam Mohini High School is a higher secondary school in Gangabag, Malda, West Bengal, India. This is a boys' school and is affiliated to the West Bengal Board of Secondary Education for Madhyamik Pariksha (10th Board exams), and to the West Bengal Council of Higher Secondary Education for Higher Secondary Examination (12th Board exams). The school was established in 1966.

Notable alumni
 Sandip Chakrabarti

See also
Education in India
List of schools in India
Education in West Bengal

References

External links
 

Primary schools in West Bengal
High schools and secondary schools in West Bengal
Schools in Malda district
Educational institutions established in 1966
1966 establishments in West Bengal